Novell File Management Suite is a  suite of applications designed for the  identity -based indexing and management of user files on enterprise networks. The three components of the File Management Suite are Novell Storage Manager, Novell File Reporter, and Novell Dynamic File Services. The Suite was introduced in January 2010.

References

External links
"Novell Storage Manager Strikes Data Management Gold"
Novell File Management Suite Reviewer's Guide
Novell File Management Suite White Paper
 Cloud Management Suite

Novell
Novell software
Storage software
Data management software